Mario de Leon Baltazar (September 3, 1926 – July 9, 2012) was the Catholic prelate of the Territorial Prelature of Batanes, Philippines.

Ordained to the priesthood in 1953, Baltazar was named prelate of the Territorial Prelature of Batanes in 1966 and resigned in 1995.

Notes

20th-century Filipino Roman Catholic priests
1926 births
2012 deaths